The Old German Baptist Brethren (OGBB) is a Schwarzenau Brethren denomination of Anabaptist Christianity. 

It emerged from a division among the Schwarzenau Brethren in 1881 and is aligned with Old Order Anabaptism. The Schwarzenau Brethren tradition has roots in Anabaptism, as well as in the Radical Pietist revival. 

The Old German Baptist Brethren practices believer's baptism as the biblically valid form of baptism. It is also characterized by strict religious adherence with rejection of modern culture and modern assimilation. It teaches plain dress. It is one of several Schwarzenau Brethren groups that trace their roots to 1708, when eight believers founded a new church in Schwarzenau, Germany. The Old German Baptist Brethren church has about 4,000 baptized members.

Names
The Old German Baptist Brethren are historically known as German Baptists in contrast to English Baptists, who have different roots. Other names by which they are sometimes identified are Dunkers, Dunkards, Tunkers, and Täufer, all relating to their practice of baptism by immersion. Originally known as Neu-Täufer (new Baptists), in America they used the name "German Baptist" and officially adopted the title "German Baptist Brethren" at their Annual Meeting in 1871. From their formation in 1881 and until the early 1900s the Old German Baptist Brethren were often referred to as "Old Order German Baptist Brethren". There are several different Brethren groups that are not related to the Schwarzenau movement, such as the Plymouth Brethren that arose in England and Ireland early in the 19th century through the labors of Edward Cronin and John Nelson Darby. However, the teachings of Darby, called Dispensationalism, have been influential among some in the Old German Baptist Brethren.

History

Beginnings

The Schwarzenau Brethren were first organized in 1708 under the leadership of Alexander Mack (1679–1735) in Schwarzenau, Germany, now part of Bad Berleburg in North Rhine-Westphalia. In August of the same year, five men, including Mack, and three women gathered at the Eder, a small river that flows through Schwarzenau, to perform baptism as an outward symbol of their new interpretation of the faith. One of the members of the group first baptized Mack, who then, in turn, baptized the other seven. Mack along with the seven others believed that the Roman Catholic, Lutheran, and Reformed churches were taking extreme liberties with the true message of Christianity revealed in the New Testament, so they rejected state-church unions, use of force and violence, and the established liturgy, including infant baptism and existing Eucharistic practices. The founding Brethren were broadly influenced by Radical Pietist understandings of an invisible, nondenominational church of awakened Christians who would fellowship together in equality, purity, and love, following Jesus while awaiting Christ's return.

A notable influence was Ernest Christopher Hochmann von Hochenau, a traveling Pietist minister. While living in Schriesheim, his hometown, Mack invited Hochmann to come and minister there. Like others who influenced the Brethren, Hochmann considered the pure church to be spiritual and did not believe that a highly organized church was necessary. By 1708, the date of the first Brethren baptisms, Mack had rejected this position in favor of forming a separate church with visible rules and ordinances—including threefold baptism by immersion, a three-part Love Feast (that combined communion with feet washing and an evening meal), anointing, and use of Church discipline steps as instructed in Matthew 18, culminating with the "ban" against wayward members.

Religious persecution drove the Brethren to take refuge in Friesland, Netherlands. In 1719 Peter Becker led a group to settle in Pennsylvania. In 1720 forty Brethren families settled in Surhuisterveen in Friesland. They lived among the Mennonites there, remaining until 1729, when all but a handful emigrated to America in three separate groups from 1719 to 1733. By 1740, nearly all of the "Schwarzenau" Brethren had relocated to Pennsylvania and they ceased to exist as an organized group in Europe.

Peter Becker organized the first American congregation at Germantown, Pennsylvania, on December 25, 1723. In 1743 Christopher Sauer, an early preacher and a printer, printed a Bible in German, the first published in a European language in North America.

Early schisms
The first schism from the general body of German Baptist Brethren occurred in 1728, but more followed after the American Revolution, as different groups sought their own ways. The first separatists became the Seventh Day Dunker Brethren, whose distinctive principle was that they believed that Saturday was still the true Sabbath. They were founded by Conrad Beissel (1690–1768).

In 1732 Beissel led the establishment of a semi-monastic community with a convent and monastery at Ephrata, in what is now Lancaster County, Pennsylvania. While celibate, the community also welcomed believing families, who lived nearby and participated in joint worship. The monastic feature and celibacy were gradually abandoned after the American Revolution. In 1814 the Society was incorporated as the Seventh Day German Baptist Church. Several branches were established, some of which still exist. A group called the Church of God or "New Dunkers" withdrew in 1848. They disbanded in August 1962.

In 1782 the Brethren forbade slaveholding by its members.

The German Baptist Brethren grew from a small sect of about 1,500 German speaking members in 1790 to a mainly English speaking church with about 58,000 members in 500 congregation in 1880.

The divisions of the early 1880s

In the early 1880s there was a three-way division among the German Baptist Brethren: In 1881, the more conservative and traditional Old German Baptist Brethren withdrew from the larger progressive faction in order to maintain older customs, traditional dress, and simpler forms of worship. In 1883, the Brethren Church left the German Baptist Brethren over several matters revolving around separation 
from following fleeting fashions and whatever is popular 
with the world (James 4:4) including Sunday Schools, higher education, expensive and luxurious dress fads, revivalism, nationalism and practicing less church discipline.

The Old German Baptist Brethren and Old Brethren churches represent the conservative faction who wanted to remain plain and live a more simple, family and church-focused lifestyle. They wanted to focus on personal discipleship, daily and weekly worship, bearing  one another's burdens, and working together to build relationships while conquering obstacles. They did not want to lose their children to a fast, self-centered lifestyle and kept a cautious attitude, waiting to observe resulting consequences rather than automatically accepting every new innovation of the 19th century. The Brethren Church represents the more liberal faction, pushing ahead to new frontiers because of their belief that a newer way of doing things is a better way. The mainline progressive German Baptist Brethren changed their name to the Church of the Brethren in 1908.

The most conservative Brethren churches emphasize consistency, commitment to daily discipleship and literally following the New Testament, which is the order of the Brethren. They favor a capella singing,  as the voice is the best instrument, made by God. They do not trust the fruit of spiritual innovations, such as Sunday Schools and emotional extended meetings. They promote plain dress, simple uncomplicated living, reading and following the words of Jesus. They believe that worldly amusements and entertainment appeal to and feed the flesh rather than the spirit, often taking the place of regular worship and fellowship, distracting believers and becoming forms of idolatry. They believe Jesus is calling all of us to be disciples, to love and follow Him. The progressives in the Brethren church focused on grace, novel practices, assimilation and acceptance. They promote higher education, salaried ministers, liturgical services and Sunday Schools, and revivalism. The majority of Brethren hold a position between the two extremes.

In 1869 and 1880, a group of Brethren in the Miami River Valley of Ohio submitted a petition to Annual Conference to stop the liberalization and return to traditional Biblical Brethren values. On both occasions, a more moderate petition was submitted to the delegates. Both times, the Miami River Valley group found the rewording unclear and ambiguous, and therefore unacceptable.

In 1881, they resubmitted their petition to Annual Conference, and it was rejected for violating a technical procedure. In November 1881, conservative Brethren led by the Miami River Valley group met and formally split from the Church of the Brethren to form the Old German Baptist Brethren. They held their first annual meeting in 1882.

At the same time, Henry Holsinger, a leader of the progressives in the church, published writings that some Brethren considered slanderous, anti-Jesus, and unscriptural and schismatic. As a result, he was dis-fellowshipped from the 1882 annual meeting of the Brethren. He met with other progressives on June 6 and 7, 1883, and together they formed The Brethren Church.

The remaining middle group retained the name German Baptist Brethren. At the Annual Conference of 1908 at Des Moines, Iowa, the name was officially changed to the Church of the Brethren. Their Annual Conference justified the name change by citing the predominant use of English in the church, the fact that the name "German Baptist" frustrated some mission work, and that it would helpfully disassociate the denomination from the Old German Baptist Brethren.

Departure of small conservative groups
In the early 20th century several more conservative Brethren left the Old German Baptist Brethren and formed their own churches.

In 1913, a group broke away in Indiana and formed the Old Brethren. In 1915, another congregation of Old Brethren was organized in California. The issue which is often given as the initial cause for division was the changes brought in with acceptance of automobiles and telephones among the Old German Baptist Brethren. Generally, the Old Brethren also wanted more unity and wanted to uphold the old order form of annual meeting which was simpler than had recently developed among the Old German Baptists. There was more division over the acceptance of the automobile in 1930. After the 1930 divide, those who adopted the use of the automobile placed less stress on annual meeting authority than did the parent body, believing it to be more for edification and teaching. Personal conviction from the Holy Spirit and Scripture rather than legislative decisions of annual meeting is now the basis for adherence to the church's order. Old Brethren adult membership, among six congregations (in California, Arkansas, Indiana, and Ohio), in 2000 was 250.

In 1939, Old Brethren who wished to maintain the stress on annual meeting decisions and the rejection of automobiles, telephones, electricity, and tractors formed a group called the Old Brethren German Baptists. Old Brethren German Baptist membership in 2012 was over 100 and growing rapidly, with congregations in Indiana, Ohio and Missouri.

As the original Old German Baptist Brethren body became more accepting of automobiles, another group withdrew in 1921 to become the Old Order German Baptist Brethren. They do not use automobiles, electric power or telephones but do use tractors in the field and for transportation on the public roadways for work related activities, such as going to work sites or selling produce in towns. Two other minor divisions in the parent body of "Old German Baptist Brethren" occurred in the 1990s resulting in three car driving congregations of 185 total members. While each conference has an "official" name, members of all conferences refer to themselves generally as Old Order German Baptists.

Further division

In 2009, a major division was a result of the rejection, by a large percentage of members (approximately 2,400 individuals), of an unprecedented committee report  adopted by the 2009 Annual Meeting held near Waterford, CA. The report stated in part, "Members of the Old German Baptist Brethren Church in full fellowship and in good standing with the Church, believe and agree that the Old German Baptist Brethren’s interpretation of NT doctrine is scriptural and has been prompted by the Holy Spirit and it is their mind to remain in this fellowship and to teach, support and promote the unity of the Spirit in the bond of peace. It will be expected that members hearing the reading of this report will be willing to accept the same."

No positions on specific questions of doctrine or church practice before the Conference were addressed in the Report, though the general understanding was that it asked for an affirmation of loyalty to traditional doctrine and practice as interpreted by the more traditional/conservative arm of membership. Conference representatives were sent to each district (congregation) in the brotherhood to determine the willingness of each member to accept the report. Those who refused to accept the report gave their names, which were recorded and sent to the secretary of the standing committee for processing, and they were disfellowshipped (ie excommunicated). Members who refused to accept the Report were given 60 days to reconsider their decision without repercussion.  Those who remained silent or did not attend the meetings were assumed to be in agreement or willing to submit to the decision, and were retained as members.

A majority of the members who did not accept the Report and were subsequently disfellowshipped participated in the re-organization of a new body, which was organized at a July 3, 2009, meeting in Troy, Ohio, called the Old German Baptist Brethren, New Conference. Several fundamental disagreements identified by the New Conference and adherents  included: allowing regular group Bible studies outside of the Sunday worship setting; permitting open outreach & mission efforts; use of email and the Internet; Scriptural application of church discipline as guided by Matthew 18; and preservation of the historical Brethren practice of decision-making by "taking the voice" (or vote) of every member, whereas no discussion was permitted upon presentation of the 2009 Report, and only a vote of affirmation was permitted.

The New Conference Polity Statement, declares that "the church must never be elevated to a place of equality with Jesus Christ," reflecting the New Conference's somewhat more individualistic approach to faith (in opposition to the parent body's stronger emphasis on unity through mutual practice and theology). The majority of the remainder of the departing members have joined similar existing groups such as the Old Brethren or Dunkard Brethren, or moved on to more mainstream church fellowships. Since the split, a few families who stood with the New Conference in 2009 have returned to their Old Conference membership, primarily in Ohio and Indiana, and several families have migrated to the New Conference from the Old since that time, primarily in Ohio, Indiana, Virginia, and Pennsylvania.

Recent events
Following the division of 2009, the majority that remained with the Old German Baptist Brethren (often referred to as the "Old Conference") decided at their 2010 Annual Conference to continue the ban on email and the internet. They agreed to allow very limited use for member businesses already online, with the understanding that they discontinue use within three years.

To date, the subsequent queries again requesting some form of business use have been met with a discussions ending in reaffirmation of the 2010 decision. As of 2015, there is a group of nine brethren working autonomously with outside communications companies to arrange a "third party" system to allow their members access to needed online information without actually using the World Wide Web themselves.

An increasing adherence to traditional patterns of dress and practice has also become significantly more evident among the remaining conservative membership. A trickle of members moving to the more traditional horse and buggy groups (primarily Old Brethren German Baptist) may also have slowed. Increasing conservatism in the Old German Baptist Brethren has also had a bearing on the decision of a majority of the former members of the Philip Hess faction of the German Baptist Brethren to join the Old Conference of the Old German Baptist Brethren after the dissolution of that group in September–October 2010.

The increasing conservatism since the 2009 division was not sufficient for the majority of the Gene Wagoner faction of the German Baptist Brethren to move to the Old German Baptist Brethren upon the dissolution of that group in spring of 2012, although several of them did reunite with the parent body Old German Baptist Brethren Church prior to the 2012 Annual Conference. Several of the former members of that faction have joined the small migration of former Old German Baptist Brethren moving to Trenton, MO and have united with them in the more traditional horse and buggy Old Brethren German Baptist group.

After the 2015 Annual Meeting voiced to formally permit the filtered/third-party Internet service facilitated by the "Brethren Resource Group", several of the more-conservative congregations who were dissatisfied with the decision of the majority repeatedly sent queries to subsequent Annual Meetings objecting to the decision and the procedure used at the 2015 meeting. Not receiving satisfaction and being unwilling to submit to the repeated decisions and re-affirmations of the general brotherhood at Annual Meeting, and following the work of a committee of elders called to the Antietam, PA congregation to resolve several issues, there were two independent meetings held on November 11-12 and December 9-10, 2020, on a farm near Greencastle, Pennsylvania, to discuss the grievances of the dissatisfied members and to consider a formal separation from the main body.  

An agreement was reached by those present to re-organize as The Old German Baptist Church, and between 500 and 600 members aligned themselves with this new group; the majority of the new membership was primarily composed of individuals from Pennsylvania, along with others from New York, Wisconsin, California, Ohio, Indiana, Kansas, Missouri, and West Virginia.  While technology was the most vocal point of contention over the last several years, there were several resolutions adopted at the December 2020 by the separating members. These included a commitment to unanimity in decision-making (which has since been modified), greater caution and avoidance of internet usage and related technology, greater adherence and discipline toward plainness of dress, and the prevalence of conference decisions over local practices.

Theology

In general, the theological position of the OGBB can be diverse, and often represented geographically. A Doctrinal Treatise was published in 1952, primarily for the sake of young men who went abroad in Civilian Public Service camps or other work programs, and it presents many doctrinal distinctives of the OGBB; however it is not a creed or formal statement of faith to which members must subscribe, as members interpret and apply some of its various theological points differently.  When asked for a creed, most Old German Baptist Brethren claim that the New Testament is the closest thing they have to a creed.

Generally, the OGBB believe in Free Will, and that faith and baptism in the Lord Jesus Christ is required for salvation, to be followed by a life of literal obedience to His word (the result of that faith). When there is a question of applications for a specific issue or area of life for which Scripture has no clear mandate, the members gather once a year at their Annual Meeting and consider the issue in light of Scripture, past practices, and current contexts, then voice (or vote) on it, with a few chose leaders of the church counting the votes. While the Brethren strive for unanimity in any decision, that is difficult to achieve, and often the vote is decided by a majority voice. If such cannot be reached, the issue is laid down (closed) or deferred until the following Annual Meeting. These decisions are kept on record as "Minutes of the Annual Meeting", and referred back to for consideration when there is any significant deviation from them. They touch on many things, including dress, technology, political involvement, and entertainment. This Minute Book is kept in the homes of the members. 

The theological position of the OGBB was largely established by Peter Nead and William J. Shoup, both prolific Brethren authors and preachers. Nead, in particular, was a schooled Lutheran who converted to the Brethren and brought a refined system of teaching to the fellowship. Today the writings of Alexander Mack, R. H. Miller, Peter Nead, and the collected essays of Samuel Kinsey, along with the collected articles of the group's monthly periodical, "The Vindicator", form their most important doctrinal writings. A lively series of devotional and doctrinal essays continue to appear in the Vindicator each month. Ex-member Michael Hari contributed two widely circulated books of essays titled Brethren Thinking and One Faith in recent years.

Religious practice
The Old German Baptist Brethren historically believe in  baptismal regeneration, placing the emphasis on the obedience of the new believer through faith, repentance, and baptism rather than a sacramental view that the water itself washes away sins. This is the official position of the church while individual members may differ somewhat in personal belief. They are noted for several ordinances like believer's baptism by trine immersion, feet washing, the love feast, a communion of unleavened bread and wine, the holy kiss, and anointing of the sick with oil. Baptism is by trine- and forward- immersion in water. They hold an Annual Meeting associated with Pentecost, and cooperate in publishing a monthly periodical, The Vindicator.

The Old German Baptist Brethren are a non-resistant sect, whose young men usually file as conscientious objectors in times of war. Members of the church do not believe in defending themselves against physical attacks outside of war, either. Members do not file lawsuits, defend themselves against lawsuits, or use liens to collect debts.

Worship
The form of worship is fairly consistent from church to church, with a cappella singing, kneeling in prayer, sermons by congregationally elected ministers (called the plural ministry because of having several ministers in each congregation), and provision for divided seating with women and men assembled on opposite sides of the meetinghouse. The Old German Baptist Brethren use their own hymn book, of which most members maintain a personal copy. The hymns were written by both Old German Baptist Brethren members and many well-known authors from the 18th and 19th centuries. The style of singing is generally started and led by a congregationally-elected deacon, and is slow, usually in 4 part harmony or unison. The more conservative in practice a district may be, the slower the singing tends to be, though the difference may not be immediately obvious to visitors. The singing is similar to that of River Brethren or Old Order Mennonites.

Plain dress
The Old German Baptist Brethren dress plain. The women's dress is similar to the dress patterns of River Brethren or plain Mennonites, like the "Joe Wengers" (Groffdale Conference Mennonite Church) or the Beachy Amish: long dresses and white cloth or net cap-style head coverings. The main difference is the use of a Brethren-style angled cape over the dress bodice, which is only attached around the neck and not at the waist as Mennonites and Amish do. The more conservative women may wear a loose winter cloak instead of a more form-fitting coat, and a black bonnet over their white covering when going out. The men wear beards without moustaches, button up shirts, plain coats without lapels at worship services and often the more conservative men wear suspenders and black hats. The beard, worn without the mustache, is required for those in ministry, and encouraged but not required for lay brothers.

Restrictions on technology

There are no radios, television sets, stereos, tape recorders, VCRs, or large musical instruments in members' homes. There has been a long debate over the use of the Internet since the mid-1990s; contrary to various reports, it was not the primary catalyst for the split in 2009 or 2020 (see above paragraph on 2009 division).

Members and congregations
According to the 2009 Directory of Officials, the Old German Baptist Brethren had 6,149 members in 56 churches at the end of  2008, although this number was reduced to approximately 3600 members after the 2009 Annual Meeting Report which led to the organization of the Old German Baptist Brethren (New Conference). The largest concentration of congregations is in Ohio (16), followed by Indiana (9), California (4), Kansas (5), Pennsylvania (5), Virginia (4), Washington (3), Florida (2), Wisconsin (2), Georgia (1), Michigan (1), Missouri (1), Montana (1), Oregon (1), Tennessee (1), and West Virginia (1). Almost 54% of the members live in Ohio and Indiana. The numbers above refer to the Old German Baptist Brethren before the split in 2009. In 2016 the Old German Baptist Brethren had about 4,000 members.

References
 Charles D. Thompson Jr.: The Old German Baptist Brethren: Faith, Farming, and Change in the Virginia Blue Ridge, (2006) University of Illinois Press.
 Carl F. Bowman: Brethren Society: The Cultural Transformation of a Peculiar People, (1995) Johns Hopkins University Press.
 Donald B. Kraybill and Carl D. Bowman: On the Backroad to Heaven: Old Order Hutterites, Mennonites, Amish, and Brethren, (2001) Johns Hopkins University Press.
 Marcus Miller: Roots by the River, (1973) Independently Published.
 Donald F. Durnbaugh, (editor): Brethren Encyclopedia, Vol. I-III, (1983) The Brethren Encyclopedia Inc.
 Donald F. Durnbaugh and Dale V. Ulrich (editors), Carl Bowman, contributing editor: Brethren Encyclopedia, Vol. IV, (2006) The Brethren Encyclopedia Inc.
 Donald F. Durnbaugh: Fruit of the Vine, A History of the Brethren 1708-1995, (1997) Brethren Press.
 Michael Hari: Brethren Thinking, (2011) Der Bruederbote Press.
 Donald B. Kraybill and C. Nelson Hostetter: Anabaptist World USA, (2001) Herald Press.
 Gerald J. Mast: The Old German Baptist Brethren Church Division of 2009: The Debate over the Internet and the Authority of the Annual Meeting in The Mennonite Quarterly Review 2014, pages 45–64.

Notes

External links
About German Baptists

OGBB New Conference

Rural society
Brethren denominations in North America
Anabaptist organizations established in the 19th century
Radical Pietism